The following are international rankings of Barbados.

Economic

 The Wall Street Journal and the Heritage Foundation: Index of Economic Freedom 2006, ranked  out of 157 countries
2005 ranked 32nd of 155 countries
International Monetary Fund: GDP (nominal) per capita 2006, ranked  out of 182 countries
International Monetary Fund: GDP (nominal) 2006, ranked  out of 181 countries
Minimum wages Index
World Economic Forum: Global Competitiveness Index 2006–2007, ranked 31st out of 125 countries
 World Economic Forum, The Global Information Technology Report 2006-2007's "Networked Readiness Index":
 2006-2007: ranked 40th out of 122 countries
 World Bank:
 Total GDP per capita
 2003 (World Bank): ranked 38 -- $15,712
 Total GDP (nominal)
 2003: ranked 138 -- $2,628
 - GDP - (PPP) per capita:
 2004: ranked 59 of 232 countries & territories --  $15,700 59th

General
 United Nations: Human Development Index 2006, ranked 31st out of 177 countries
2005, ranked 30th out of 177 countries
2004, ranked 29th out of 177 countries
2003, ranked 27th out of 175 countries
2002, ranked 31st out of 173 countries
2001, ranked 31st out of 162 countries
2000, ranked 30th out of 174 countries
1999, ranked 29th out of 174 countries
1998, N/A
Literacy rate, countries by literacy rate - by UNDP
2005: ranked 23rd of 177 countries—99.7%
 A.T. Kearney/Foreign Policy Magazine: Globalization Index 2007, ranked 98th out of 62 countries

Human rights
Freedom in the World – Political Liberties
2010, ranked 1st (Joint) out of 193
Freedom in the World – Civil Rights
2010, ranked 1st (Joint) out of 193

Politics
 The Economist: Democracy Index 2009, N/A
 Property Rights Alliance: International Property Rights Index 2008, N/A
 Transparency International: Corruption Perceptions Index 2007, ranked 40 out of 163 countries
2007-2008, ranked 50th out of 133 countries
2006-2007, ranked 40th out of 146 countries
2005-2006, ranked 31st out of 125
2004-2005, ranked 21st out of 146 countries
Reporters Without Borders: Worldwide press freedom index 2007, ranked  out of 168 countries
2008, N/A

Social
Economist Intelligence Unit: Quality-of-life index 2005, ranked 33rd out of 108 countries
Fund For Peace: Failed States Index) 2009, ranked 135 out of 177
Happy Planet Index: 2006, ranked 43rd out of 178 countries
Institute for Economics and Peace Global Peace Index 2009, N/A
Save the Children: State of the World's Mothers report 
 2008: 2008 N/A
 2004: N/A

Technological
Economist Intelligence Unit e-readiness rankings 2007, ranked 9 out of 69 countries
International Telecommunication Union, Digital Access Index (Top 10 in Americas):
2002: ranked 45 of 178 countries 45th

See also 
List of indices of freedom
List of island countries by population density (Currently ranked 7th most densely populated in the world)
Lists of countries
Lists by country

References

Barbados